was a district located in Aichi Prefecture, Japan, which existed until 2005.

As of 2003, the district had an estimated population of 36,239 and a population density of 1,170.89 persons per km2. The total area was 30.95 km2.

Former towns and villages
 Heiwa
 Sobue

Merger
 On April 1, 2005 - the towns of Heiwa and Sobue were merged into the expanded city of Inazawa. Nakashima District was dissolved as a result of this merger.

Former districts of Aichi Prefecture